MeidasTouch is a liberal American political action committee formed in March 2020 with the purpose to stop the reelection of Donald Trump in the 2020 United States presidential election. The SuperPAC has aligned with the Democratic Party in the 2020 United States presidential election, the 2020–21 United States Senate election in Georgia, and the 2020–21 United States Senate special election in Georgia.

History 
The committee was founded in March 2020 by three brothers from Long Island, while in quarantine due to the COVID-19 pandemic.

One of the founders, Ben Meiselas, was an attorney who represented former NFL player Colin Kaepernick.

Brett was an Emmy-winning video editor for The Ellen DeGeneres Show.

Jordan was a marketing supervisor living in  Brooklyn, New York.

The group name and slogan come from their mother and father, combining their father's last name, Meiselas, and their mother's maiden name, Golden, while alluding to the mythological Greek king Midas known for his ability to turn everything he touched into gold.

Timeline

2020 U.S. Presidential Election 
On April 22, 2020, the committee released their first video, titled "Are You Better Off?", which criticized Trump's handling of the COVID-19 pandemic in the United States; The committee shared the video in a Twitter reply to George Conway, which was then retweeted by him.

On June 6, 2020, another video was released, called "Bye Ivanka"; it took parts out of her commencement speech and focused on her relation with China and criticized Trump's handling of the coronavirus crisis. Her Wichita State University Tech speech was canceled due to student and teacher pressure.

On June 17, 2020, another video was released, "Gop Cowards", which accused Republican senators of being cowards. Near the end of the video, followers are urged to vote 11 Republican legislators out.

On June 23, the committee released a video called "Trump Kills US". The video focuses on Trump's comment at his Tulsa rally which urged doctors to "slow the testing down". MeidasTouch called it "Mass murder on a national scale".

On July 8, a new video was released called "Creepy Trump". It compiled Kellyanne Conway's comments on Joe Biden and put it together with Trump statements. The ad uses clips of Conway's comments and remarks Trump has presented about women, and was played on Fox News, CNN and MSNBC.

On July 14, another video was released called "#ByeDonJr". It takes Donald Trump Jr.'s comments on Fox News about Biden and applies them against Trump. The video also further criticizes the older Trump's handling of the pandemic.

The group continued its activities after the November 3 elections. On November 27, it claimed credit for making #DiaperDon the top Twitter trending topic in the US, via a tweet that mocked (as summarized by The Independent) a "press briefing ... which saw [Donald Trump] furiously assail a reporter from behind a surprisingly small desk", and provoked Trump into calling for the immediate abolishing of Section 230 "for purposes of National Security".

2020–2021 Georgia Senate Elections 
The SuperPAC targeted Republican candidates in the 2020–21 United States Senate election in Georgia and the 2020–21 United States Senate special election in Georgia with several televised attack ads, billboards, direct mailings and door-to-door canvassing efforts.

Most notably, MeidasTouch aired an advertisement called "The Grinches of Georgia." CNN said of the ads, "Humor is the chosen route for Democrat-backed Meidas Touch. Their television ads show Perdue and Loeffler with green faces and Grinch-like features. A nursery rhyme narration includes the verse, "Their stockings were stuffed from the stocks that were sold, when they heard Covid was coming, before we were told." The Hill credits MeidasTouch as framing the Republican candidates Kelly Loeffler and David Perdue as "Looting Loeffler" and "Chicken Perdue," respectively. "The ad takes aim at the senators—dubbed 'Looting Loeffler and Chicken Perdue'—and highlights the controversies surrounding their stock purchases," The Hill said. The "Grinches" ad campaign also included matching billboards and mailers.

Criticism and controversy

In April 2021, Rolling Stone magazine did an in-depth look into MeidasTouch and their activities, called "The Trouble with Meidas Touch". Among other findings, Rolling Stone noted their campaign fundraising was "nonsensical and a more effective tool for fundraising than for helping Democrats win elections" and that "MeidasTouch's grandiose self-promotion doesn't match reality".

In February 2022, singer-songwriter India Arie shared a compilation of podcaster Joe Rogan saying the racial slur nigger on The Joe Rogan Experience on Instagram. Rogan apologized, calling his past language "regretful and shameful" while also saying that the clips were "taken out of context" and he only quoted the slur to discuss its use by others. The footage in question was first published by the political action committee PatriotTakes, an affiliate of MeidasTouch. This resulted in allegations of a defamation attempt by MeidasTouch, which the founders denied in an interview with Barstool Sports founder David Portnoy, instead attributing the source of the footage to Alex Jones who was a recurring guest on Rogan's show. Rogan described the video compilation as a "political hit job".

References

External links

2020 establishments in the United States
Never Trump movement
Political organizations based in the United States
United States political action committees
Progressivism in the United States
Organizations established in 2020
Left-wing populism in the United States